Embleya scabrispora is a bacterium species from the genus Embleya which has been isolated from soil from Japan. Embleya scabrispora produces the antibiotic hitachimycin.

References

Further reading

External links
Type strain of Streptomyces scabrisporus at BacDive -  the Bacterial Diversity Metadatabase

Streptomycineae
Bacteria described in 2004